The 2000 Vuelta a Burgos was the 22nd edition of the Vuelta a Burgos road cycling stage race, which was held from 7 August to 10 August 2000. The race started in Miranda de Ebro and finished in Burgos. The race was won by Leonardo Piepoli of the  team.

General classification

References

Vuelta a Burgos
2000 in road cycling
2000 in Spanish sport